Munyoro Nyamau (Hezekiah Munyoro Nyamau; born 5 December 1942  or 6 December 1938) is a Kenyan former athlete and winner of the gold medal in the 4 × 400 m relay at the 1972 Summer Olympics.

He won inter-school championships in Kisii when he was 15.

He reached the semifinals of the 400 m and won a surprise silver medal as a member of the Kenyan 4 × 400 m relay team at the 1968 Summer Olympics. His teammates were Daniel Rudisha, Naftali Bon and Charles Asati.

Nyamau won the gold medal in the 4 × 400 m relay at the 1970 British Commonwealth Games. In September 1970, Nyamau - with teammates Naftali Bon, Thomas Saisi and Robert Ouko - set the men's 4x880 yard world record at 7:11.6.

At the Munich Olympic Games, Nyamau was eliminated in the quarterfinals of the 400 m, but he won the gold medal in the absence of the United States as a member of the Kenyan 4 × 400 m relay team. Other members of the team were Charles Asati, Robert Ouko and Julius Sang.

He joined the Kenya Army in 1963 and was employed by them until his retirement in 1997.

References

External links
 
 
 

1942 births
Living people
Kenyan male sprinters
Athletes (track and field) at the 1968 Summer Olympics
Athletes (track and field) at the 1972 Summer Olympics
Olympic athletes of Kenya
Olympic gold medalists for Kenya
Olympic silver medalists for Kenya
Commonwealth Games medallists in athletics
Athletes (track and field) at the 1970 British Commonwealth Games
Commonwealth Games gold medallists for Kenya
Medalists at the 1972 Summer Olympics
Medalists at the 1968 Summer Olympics
Olympic gold medalists in athletics (track and field)
Olympic silver medalists in athletics (track and field)
Personnel of the Kenya Army
Medallists at the 1970 British Commonwealth Games